Pinhoe railway station is on the eastern edge of the city of Exeter in Devon, England, that serves the village of Pinhoe. It was opened by the London and South Western Railway (LSWR) in 1871 but is now operated by South Western Railway which provides services on the West of England Main Line.

History
The village's station opened eleven years later on 30 October 1871. The original wooden footbridge was replaced by a concrete structure cast at nearby Exmouth Junction works, the first such footbridge erected by the Southern Railway, which had taken over from the LSWR in 1923.

Goods facilities were provided from 3 April 1882, and in 1943 a government food cold store was built to the west of the station that was served by its own siding. The passenger station was closed by on 7 March 1966 when the Western Region of British Railways withdrew the local stopping services from the line. Goods facilities were withdrawn on 10 June 1967 and the cold store siding (now operated by a private company) closed in 1979.

The station was reopened by British Rail on 16 May 1983.Passengers waiting at the reopened station have to make do with glass and metal shelters. Instead of a country village it was now on the eastern edge of the city. The initial trial period for commuter services proved successful and a regular service now operates all day, seven days a week. Between 2003 and 2008 passenger numbers increased by 530% and they are still increasing with an estimate of 94,354 users in 2015–16.

Station buildings 
A two-storey brick building between the road and the eastbound platform is the former station master's house. The main station building used to be next to this but was demolished after the station closed in the 1960s.

Location
The station is just south of the village centre to the west of Station Road and access to the platforms is from this road; a footpath also links the eastbound platform with Main Road.

Services 

Off-peak, all services at Pinhoe are operated by South Western Railway using  and  DMUs.

The typical off-peak service in trains per hour is:
 1 tph to  via 
 1 tph to 

Signalling
The station was built next to the level crossing of Pinn Lane. This was operated by the station staff until 1875 when a small signal box was brought into use; it was situated on the north side of the line to the east of the road. The initial 11 levers were extended to 17 in 1943 when the cold store was built. The level crossing gates were replaced with lifting barriers on 17 March 1968. The signal box was finally closed on 13 February 1988, the level crossing and signals now being controlled from Exmouth Junction.

See also
 Southern Railway routes west of Salisbury

References

External links

Railway stations in Exeter
Former London and South Western Railway stations
Railway stations in Great Britain opened in 1871
Railway stations in Great Britain closed in 1966
Railway stations in Great Britain opened in 1983
Reopened railway stations in Great Britain
Railway stations served by South Western Railway
Beeching closures in England
Railway stations served by Great Western Railway
DfT Category F2 stations